Solid Air UL-Bau Franz is a German aircraft manufacturer based in Hundheim, Rheinland-Pfalz. The company specializes in the design and manufacture of ultralight trikes.

The company has been noted for its innovative designs and use of materials to improve maintainability. The Solid Air Diamant Twin has an unusual side-by-side configuration cockpit and a plywood engine mount laminated to a fibreglass structure to create a firewall. The Solid Air Diamant LP incorporates a two-point wing mounting that allows the carriage to be flared like a conventional airplane on landing.

Aircraft

References

External links

Aircraft manufacturers of Germany
Ultralight trikes
Homebuilt aircraft